Zoukougbeu (also known as Daoungbé) is a town in west-central Ivory Coast. It is a sub-prefecture of and the seat of Zoukougbeu Department in Haut-Sassandra Region, Sassandra-Marahoué District. Zoukougbeu is also a commune.

In 2014, the population of the sub-prefecture of Zoukougbeu was 46,195.

Villages
The ten villages of the sub-prefecture of Zoukougbeu and their population in 2014 are:

Notes

Sub-prefectures of Haut-Sassandra
Communes of Haut-Sassandra